Archaeidae, also known as assassin spiders and pelican spiders, is a spider family with about ninety described species in five genera. They are unusual in that they have "necks", ranging from long and slender to short and fat. The name "pelican spider" refers to these elongated jaws and necks used to catch their prey. Living species of Archaeidae occur in South Africa, Madagascar and Australia, with the sister family Mecysmaucheniidae occurring in southern South America and New Zealand.

Assassin spiders were first known from 40 million-year-old amber fossils which were found in Europe in the 1840s and were not known to have living varieties until 1881, when the first living assassin spider was found in Madagascar.

The fossil record of this family was first identified from Baltic amber dating to the Eocene, although many taxa from these deposits have been reassigned to Mecysmaucheniidae, Malkaridae, and Anapidae. Currently valid Baltic species include Archaea levigata and Archaea paradoxa. In 2003, Afarchaea grimaldii was described from Cretaceous Burmese amber aged between 88-95 million years, extending the record of this group considerably, the oldest fossil known of the group is Patarchaea muralis from the Middle Jurassic (Oxfordian/Callovian) of Inner Mongolia, China.

Taxonomy
The family Archaeidae was erected in 1854 by C. L. Koch and Berendt for one genus, Archaea,  initially with three extinct species, all found in amber from the Baltic Sea or Bitterfeld in Sexony-Anhalt, Germany. No living species are placed in this genus.

Extant genera
, the World Spider Catalog accepts the following genera:

 Afrarchaea Forster & Platnick, 1984 — South Africa
 Austrarchaea Forster & Platnick, 1984 — Australia
 Eriauchenus O. Pickard-Cambridge, 1881 — Madagascar
 Madagascarchaea Wood & Scharff, 2018 — Madagascar
 Zephyrarchaea Rix & Harvey, 2012 — Australia

Fossils
Fossils found in amber, particularly from the Baltic and Myanmar (Burma), have been assigned to a number of extant and extinct genera placed in the family Archaeidae. 
The extinct species Burmesarchaea grimaldii (syn. Afrarchaea grimaldii) was found in Burmese amber dated to 88–95 Mya. Jurarchaea zherikhini Eskov, 1987 was previously considered a member of this family. Still, it is more likely a holarchaeid or a pararchaeid.

 †Archaea Koch and Berendt 1854 Baltic, Bitterfeld amber, Eocene
 †Archaemecys Saupe and Selden 2009 Charentese amber, France, Cenomanian
 †Baltarchaea Eskov 1992 Baltic amber, Eocene
 †Burmesarchaea Wunderlich 2008 Burmese amber, Myanmar, Cenomanian
 †Eoarchaea Forster and Platnick 1984 Baltic, Bitterfeld amber, Eocene
 †Eomysmauchenius Wunderlich 2008 Burmese amber, Myanmar, Cenomanian
 †Lacunauchenius Wunderlich 2008 Burmese amber, Myanmar, Cenomanian
 †Myrmecarchaea Wunderlich 2004 Baltic amber, Eocene
 †Patarchaea Selden et al. 2008 Daohugou, China, Callovian
 †Planarchaea Wunderlich 2015 Burmese amber, Myanmar, Cenomanian
 †Saxonarchaea Wunderlich 2004 Baltic, Bitterfeld amber, Eocene

Phylogeny
A 2012 Bayesian phylogenetic analysis of 15 Archaeidae species, using combined molecular and morphological data, produced the cladogram shown below. Species representing modern genera found in Africa and Madagascar (Afrarchaea and Eriauchenius) were not resolved into monophyletic groups; Zephyrarchaea had not then been split off from Austrarchaea. The species found in European amber formed a clade, whereas Burmesarchaea grimaldii, from Burmese amber, appeared to be basal to modern genera.

See also
 List of Archaeidae species

References

 
Araneomorphae families